Euclea pseudebenus (Cape ebony, Ebony guarri) is a tree native to Angola, Namibia and the Cape Province region of South Africa. It is classified as a protected tree in South Africa.

See also
List of Southern African indigenous trees

References 

pseudebenus
Trees of Southern Africa
Protected trees of South Africa
Plants described in 1844